The Chamber of Deputies is the Lower house of the Congress which, along with the Senate, composes the legislature of the Dominican Republic.

The composition and powers of the House are established by Constitution of the Dominican Republic. The Chamber is composed of deputies who are divided in 178 by province, five nationally, and seven overseas.

The Chamber is charged with the passage of national legislation, known as laws, which, after concurrence by the Senate, are sent to the President of the Dominican Republic for consideration. In addition to this basic power, the Chamber has certain exclusive powers of which include the power to initiate all laws related to revenue, the Impeachment of officers elected by popular vote, the Senate or the National Council of the Magistracy who are sent to trial the Senate.

The lower chamber was called Tribunado 1844–1854, then Chamber of Representatives 1854–1878, and Chamber of Deputies since 1878.

Composition (2020–2024)
On 5 July 2020, 190 deputies were elected, including 178 by provincial districts, five by national at-large voting, and seven by Overseas Deputies. This list contains the changes that occurred after the election until 1 July 2021.

Party strengths in the Chamber of Deputies
The following table shows the composition of the Chamber of Deputies at the start of the most recent legislative periods by Electoral List (this list excludes the National Deputies and the Overseas Deputies for the elections before 2016)

The following table shows the composition of the Chamber of Deputies at the start of the most recent legislative period (2020–2024) by individual party (this list includes the National Deputies and the Overseas Deputies)

The following table shows the composition of the Chamber of Deputies at the start of the legislative period 2016–2020 by individual party (this list includes the National Deputies and the Overseas Deputies)

The following table shows the composition of the Chamber of Deputies at the start of the legislative period 2010–2016 by individual party (this list includes the National Deputies and the Overseas Deputies)

In 2010, the deputy Virgilio Meran Valenzuela win his seat like a member of MODA, but due to personal political changes, the web page of the Chamber of Deputies of the Dominican Republic, list him like a PRD deputy. Moreover, the page not list MODA as a political party with some legislative representative.

See also
Politics of the Dominican Republic
List of political parties in the Dominican Republic
Senate of the Dominican Republic.
List of presidents of the Chamber of Deputies of the Dominican Republic

References

External links
National Chamber of Deputies of the Dominican Republic
 Chamber of Deputies of the Dominican Republic (Spanish)

Government of the Dominican Republic
Dominican Republic
1844 establishments in the Dominican Republic